State Highway 6 (SH 6) is a state highway in Jharkhand, India.

Route 
SH 6 originates from its junction with Kandra-Adityapur-Jugsalai road at Jugsalai and passes through Purihasa and terminates at its junction with National Highway 220 at Hata, near the Jharkhand-Odisha border. 

The total length of SH 6 is 21 km.

References 
 

 

State Highways in Jharkhand